Max Casino (until 2013, formerly the Carson Station) and earlier, The Travelodge Casino, is a hotel and casino located in Carson City, Nevada. The Max Casino contains  of casino gaming space and 91 rooms. Max Casino had both blackjack and craps in the casino as table games from 2012 to 2017. Formerly owned by Clark Russell, the Max Hotel Casino has been owned and operated by 777 Gaming since 2011.The Max Casino currently has a wide variety of slot machines and video poker machines. The casino also has a live entertainment stage, and a sports book operated by William Hill, a major Nevada and international sportsbook company. 

On September 11, 2015, the Max Casino (formerly the Carson Station) was issued 71 complaints by the Nevada Gaming Commission citing many violations of Nevada Gaming Laws.

References

External links
 

1972 establishments in Nevada
Casino hotels
Casinos completed in 1972
Casinos in Carson City, Nevada
Hotels in Carson City, Nevada
Resorts in Nevada